Thomas Edmund Russell Moreland (1901–1986) was a Scottish amateur footballer who played in the Scottish League for Queen's Park, Heart of Midlothian, Hamilton Academical and Third Lanark as a forward or left half. In addition to managing Clyde, he served Third Lanark as player-manager and later as a board member.

Club career 
After beginning his career with Petershill, Moreland played 11 seasons as a forward or left half for Scottish League clubs Queen's Park, Heart of Midlothian, Hamilton Academical and Third Lanark. As a player, he was a member of Queen's Park's 1922–23 Second Division-winning team and later achieved the same feat as player-manager of Third Lanark in 1930–31. After retiring as a player and departing Third Lanark in 1934, Moreland became manager of First Division club Clyde in 1935 and managed the club to consecutive Scottish Cup semi-finals during the 1935–36 and 1936–37 seasons.

Representative career 
Moreland was selected for the Glasgow FA's annual challenge match against Sheffield FA in 1925.

Personal life 
Moreland was also active as a boxing promoter and promoted the fights of Jackie Paterson. He ran a sports emporium on Argyle Street in Glasgow, which went into liquidation in 1956.

Career statistics

Club

Manager

Honours

As a player 
Queen's Park

 Scottish League Second Division: 1922–23

Third Lanark
 Scottish League Second Division: 1930–31

As a manager 
Third Lanark
 Scottish League Second Division: 1930–31

References

Scottish footballers
Scottish Football League players
Association football forwards
Queen's Park F.C. players
Date of death missing
Association football wing halves
Association football player-managers
Scottish football managers
Third Lanark A.C. managers
Clyde F.C. managers
Scottish Football League managers
Petershill F.C. players
Heart of Midlothian F.C. players
Hamilton Academical F.C. players
Third Lanark A.C. players
1901 births
1986 deaths
Third Lanark A.C. non-playing staff
Boxing promoters